Broos can have the following meanings:

Orăştie, (German: Broos, Hungarian: Szászváros), city in south-western Transylvania, Romania
Broos (film), a 1997 Dutch film

See also
Bros (disambiguation)
Bruce (disambiguation)